Xu Shoushang (1883–1948) was a Chinese writer.

He was one of the co-authors of the Twelve Symbols national emblem in 1912.

References

1883 births
1948 deaths
Chinese literary critics
Modern Chinese poetry
Modernist writers
Republic of China essayists
Republic of China novelists
Republic of China poets
Writers from Shaoxing
Educators from Shaoxing
Poets from Zhejiang
20th-century essayists